Crail market cross is located in Crail, Fife, Scotland. Erected in the early 17th century and now Category B listed, it is a mercat cross with a square chamfered shaft set on a stepped base. It has a capital and unicorn finial, added in 1887 by Fife architect John Currie.

The cross stands just to the north of Crail Tolbooth and Town Hall.

It was formerly a scheduled monument between 1962 and 2016.

Gallery

See also
Mercat cross

References

Buildings and structures in Crail
17th-century establishments in Scotland
Monumental crosses in Scotland